Emerson de Andrade Santos (born April 23, 1980), also known as Emerson Paulista or just Emerson, is a Brazilian footballer who currently plays for Esporte Clube Noroeste.

Biography
In February 2008 Emerson joined Japanese club FC Tokyo in 1-year deal. The club did not renewed his contract in December 2008. In April 2009 he returned to Brazil and signed a short-term contract with Brasa Futebol Clube, a proxy club of investment group and football agent Energy Sports. He was represented by Energy Sports but did not form any deal with any clubs in the first half of the 2009 season. In mid-2009 he left for Bragantino.

Emerson signed for Shonan Bellmare in July 2010 and vas was released in December 2010.

References

External links

profile

Living people
1980 births
Brazilian footballers
Brazilian expatriate footballers
Association football forwards
Sociedade Esportiva Palmeiras players
Real Murcia players
Iraklis Thessaloniki F.C. players
FC Tokyo players
Shonan Bellmare players
J1 League players
Sociedade Esportiva e Recreativa Caxias do Sul players
Mogi Mirim Esporte Clube players
Clube do Remo players
Clube Atlético Juventus players
Esporte Clube São Bento players
Associação Atlética Ponte Preta players
Clube Atlético Bragantino players
Paulista Futebol Clube players
Joinville Esporte Clube players
Botafogo Futebol Clube (SP) players
Esporte Clube Noroeste players
Expatriate footballers in Greece
Expatriate footballers in Japan
Association football midfielders
Footballers from São Paulo